Piano pedagogy is the study of the teaching of piano playing. Whereas the professional field of music education pertains to the teaching of music in school classrooms or group settings, piano pedagogy focuses on the teaching of musical skills to individual piano students. This is often done via private or semiprivate instructions, commonly referred to as piano lessons. The practitioners of piano pedagogy are called piano pedagogues, or simply, piano teachers.

Professional training 

The range of professionalism among teachers of piano is undoubtedly wide. "Competent instruction is not always assured by the number of years one has taken lessons", warned piano pedagogue and writer of numerous pedagogical books, James Bastien. The factors which affect the professional quality of a piano teacher include one's competence in musical performance, knowledge of musical genres, music history and theory, piano repertoire, experience in teaching, ability to adapt one's teaching method to students of different personalities and learning styles, education level, and so on.

Musicians without degrees in piano pedagogy 

In the United States, piano lessons may be offered by teachers without higher education specifically focused in piano performance or piano pedagogy. Some teachers may hold degrees in another discipline in music, such as music education or another performance area (voice, orchestral instrument, etc.). Other teachers, without higher education in music, may have studied piano playing independently or have been self-taught.

Undergraduate and graduate studies in piano pedagogy 

The field of piano pedagogy may be studied through academic programs culminating in the attainment of a bachelor, master, or doctoral degree at music colleges or conservatories. The undergraduate level may require many years of prior piano studies and previous teaching experience as prerequisites for application. At the graduate level, many schools require applicants to have some teaching experience and at least a bachelor of music or equivalent experience in piano performance and/or pedagogy.

Although virtually all piano pedagogy programs include a significant portion of performance requirement, the pedagogy major may be distinct from the performance major at some schools. Some members of the latter group may have the option to take courses in the teaching of piano, but not all do.

Professional organizations in the United States 

Many piano teachers hold memberships in professional organizations, to maintain their commitment to pedagogy and to network with peers and others in music. These organizations often offer teachers' workshops, conferences, mentorship programs, publications on piano pedagogy, and opportunities for scholarships, competitions, and performances for the students of members. Some prominent organizations in the United States include:

 American Council of Piano Performers – ACPP
 Music Teachers National Association – MTNA
 National Federation of Music Clubs
 National Guild of Piano Teachers
 Piano Teachers Congress of New York

Professional Organizations in Canada 

The main organization that offers certificates and testing curriculum in Canada is Royal Conservatory of Music. There are three levels in their certificate program; elementary, intermediate and advanced. Elementary pedagogy certificate enables teachers to teach beginners up to grade two piano, while intermediate certificate allows teachers to teach up to grade 6 piano. Advanced piano pedagogy is known as "ARCT" (Associate of Royal Conservatory of Toronto), which enables teachers to teach up to grade 10. There are also a number of theory and history examinations that accompany each certificate program which must be completed. There is also a Piano Teachers Federation based in Vancouver, British Columbia.

Notable piano pedagogues in history 
 Johann Nepomuk Hummel (Austria, 1778–1837)
 Carl Czerny (Austria, 1791–1857)
 Carl Philipp Emanuel Bach (Germany, 1714–1788)
 Maria Szymanowska (Poland, 1789–1831)
 Frédéric Chopin (Poland, 1810–1849)
 Theodor Leschetizky (Poland, 1830–1915)
 Franz Liszt (Hungary, 1811–1886)
 Tobias Matthay (England, 1858–1945)
Nadia Boulanger (France, 1887–1979
 Heinrich Neuhaus (Russia, 1888–1964)
 Dimitri Bashkirov (Russia, 1931–)
 Leila Fletcher (Canada, 1899–1988) Ontario, Mayfair Montgomery Publishing
 Neil A. Kjos (US, 1931–2009) Illinois, known for the James Bastien books
 Abby Whiteside (US, 1881–1956)
 Dorothy Taubman (US, 1917–2013)
 Isidor Philipp (France, 1863–1958)
 Harold Bradley (Canada 1906–1984)
 Frances Clark (US, 1905–1998)
 Stefan Ammer (Germany, 1942–)
 Ilana Vered (Israel, 1943–)
 Peter Arnold (United Kingdom)
 Graham Fitch (United Kingdom)

Topics of study 

Piano pedagogy involves the study and teaching of motor, intellectual, problem-solving, and artistic skills involved in playing the piano effectively. Citing the influence of Zoltán Kodály, Carl Orff, Émile Jaques-Dalcroze, Russian-American piano pedagogue at Longy School of Music, Dr. Faina Bryanskaya, advocates a holistic approach which integrates as many aspects of music-making as possible at once would result in the most effective piano teaching.

Ear training 

Dr. Bryanskaya argues that the foremost task for piano teachers at the beginning of a student's study is the introduction of a habit of listening to quality performances of "descriptive and strikingly expressive music", as a means for "sensitizing [the student] to the meaning of music".

Rhythm 

Teaching rhythm is important for the student to be able to learn a piece accurately, and also to confidently perform a practiced piece. Developing an internal metronome plays a significant role when teaching rhythm. Teachers may encourage students to count out loud when practicing, or practice with a metronome to develop a steady internal beat.

Notation 

Learning to read music is a critical skill for most pianists. There are generally three approaches to teaching students to read music, although combined approaches are increasingly common. The "Middle C Method", a "single note identification" method, was the most commonly taught method through the 20th century. It was introduced by W.S.B. Mathews in 1892 but popularized by Thompson's Modern Course for Piano (1936). "Middle C" teaches positions relative to the middle C; in other "single note identification" methods, other notes might be used.

The "intervocalic method", developed by Frances Clark with her Time to Begin (1955) curriculum, teaches recognition of patterns, and adds "landmark notes".

The "multi-key method", developed by Robert Pace and published in 1954, teaches students all major and minor keys fairly quickly.

Technique 

Good piano playing technique involves the simultaneous understanding in both the mind and the body of the relationships between the elements of music theory, recognition of musical patterns in notation and at the fingertips, the physical landscape of the entire range of the keyboard, finger dexterity and independence, and a wide range of touch and tone production for a variety of emotional expressions. Skills in all of these areas are typically nurtured and developed for the sake of expressing oneself more effectively and naturally through the sound of the piano, so that the elements of technique will sound alive with musicality.

Improvisation 

Modern piano lessons tend to emphasize learning notation, and may neglect developing the creative spirit and sensitive ears which lead to expressive music-making. Studies point to the need for using multiple approaches in learning musical skills which engage both sides of the brain—the analytical and the intuitive—for students to master all aspects of playing. Therefore, teaching improvisation skills may help students take ownership of the expressive quality of the music they make, and to keep music learning and practicing alive and interesting. One way to do so is to make up stories full of different emotions through improvising, in order to reinforce music theory concepts already introduced and to develop a wide range of touch and tone production.

Sight reading 

Sight reading heavily depends on the students' ability to understand rhythm, and recognize musical patterns. Teaching sight reading can include teaching students to recognize intervals, scale passage patterns, note reading and the ability to internalize rhythm. The ability to have strong knowledge of different major and minor key signatures can also help students anticipate the accidentals they should expect when sight reading.

Memorization 

Memorization is useful to perform a piece confidently. It gives the student ability and freedom to experience the music for all of its intricacies as opposed to focusing on the technicalities of notes and rhythm. Memorization can come easily to some students, and harder for others. The most common memorization technique is muscle memory. However reliance on muscle memory alone can hinder students if they have not made the cognitive connection between every note they play, and leaves room for many memory slips. To have a strong foundation of memorization, students should be able to visualize everything that they play, and be able to start from any passage.

Effective memorization results from the "combination of visual, kinaesthetic, aural and analytical skills".

Repertoire 

Well-known keyboard works written with special attention for pedagogical purposes in mind include:

 Notebook for Anna Magdalena Bach (1725) by family and friends of J.S. Bach
 Klavierbüchlein für Wilhelm Friedemann Bach, Little Preludes and Fugues, Inventions and Sinfonias, & the Well-Tempered Clavier by J.S. Bach
 Sonatinas by Muzio Clementi
 Album For the Young, Op. 68 (1848) by Robert Schumann
 Album For the Young, Op. 39 (1878) by Pyotr Ilyich Tchaikovsky
 Music for Children, Op. 65 (1935) by Sergei Prokofiev
 Pieces by Igor Stravinsky, Dmitri Kabalevsky and Aram Khatchaturian
 Mikrokosmos, Sz. 107, BB 105 (1926–39) by Béla Bartók

Venues offering instruction in piano playing 

The teaching of piano playing most often take place in the form of weekly private lessons, in which a student and a teacher have one-on-one meetings.  Instructions may sometimes be offered semi-privately (one teacher meeting with a small group of two or more students) or in classes of larger groups, in other intervals of time.  Piano lessons are offered in a variety of different settings, including the following:

 Studios of independent piano teachers
 Piano and music stores
 Community music schools
 Continuing education programs
 Preparatory division of music colleges or conservatories
 Music colleges or conservatories
 Online Distance-learning Courses
In-home/mobile music schools that travel to student's homes

See also 

 Five finger exercise
 Pedagogy
 Pianists
Group piano

References

Further reading 

Bryanskaya, Faina (1988). The Key to Music Making:  Piano Method for Beginners, Parts I, II, & III. Providence, RI:  White Lilac Press.

Gerig, Reginald (2nd Ed. 2007).  Famous Pianists and their Technique. Indiana University Press. 

Magrath, Jane (1995).  Pianist's Guide to Standard Teaching and Performance Literature.  Alfred Publishing Co.

Business skills for piano teachers and artists 

Riley, Peter Jason (2002).  The New Tax Guide for Artists of Every Persuasion. Limelight Editions: New York. 

Colombo, Sebastián (2013). Vicente Scaramuzza. La vigencia de una escuela pianística. Editorial Círculo Rojo.

External link 

Music Teachers National Association – MTNA (USA)
The Frances Clark Center for Keyboard Pedagogy
National Guild of Piano Teachers
Piano Teachers Congress of New York
Robert Schumann's Rules for Young Musicians

Pedagogy
Music education